Tropical Storm Bret was a short-lived tropical storm of the 2005 Atlantic hurricane season that made landfall in the Mexican state of Veracruz, the first of four during the season. The second named storm of the season, Bret developed along a tropical wave on June 28 in the Bay of Campeche, and quickly intensified. Tracking to the west-northwest, Bret moved ashore within 24 hours of forming, and dissipated shortly thereafter.

Bret was the first of six tropical cyclones (three hurricanes, two of them major, and three tropical storms) to make landfall in Mexico during the season. About 7,500 people were affected, and damage was estimated at 100 million pesos (2005 MXN, US$9.3 million). Two people died related to the storm.

Meteorological history 

A tropical wave accompanied by a weak surface low-pressure area crossed Central America and eastern Mexico from June 24 through June 27. The system emerged over the Bay of Campeche early on June 28, with associated convective activity increasing. Unfavorable upper-level wind shear and land interaction was expected to inhibit significant development as the system moved west-northwest. However, environmental conditions soon became more favorable and the disturbance developed more organized convection and banding features. A mid-level ridge to the north steered the depression west-northwest, a motion which it largely maintained through its dissipation. Soon after its formation, the cyclone strengthened into a tropical storm and was assigned the name Bret by the National Hurricane Center (NHC). The system reached its peak intensity around 22:35 UTC with maximum sustained winds of 40 mph (65 km/h) and a minimum pressure of 1002 mbar (hPa; 29.59 inHg). Forecasters at the NHC noted that the system's small size could lead to abrupt fluctuations in strength and organization.

After its initial quick formation, convection waxed and waned throughout June 29 and the NHC assessed no change in strength as the storm approached land. Shortly before landfall, imagery from NASA's Tropical Rainfall Measuring Mission depicted the storm's structure improving and the system may have intensified as it moved ashore. Regardless, Bret made landfall around 12:00 UTC just to the south-southeast of Tuxpan, Veracruz. Soon after moving over land Bret degraded into a tropical depression. For several hours, the cyclone maintained a well-organized structure with deep convection at its core. The mountainous terrain of Mexico subsequently took its toll on Bret, leading to its surface center decoupling from the convection aloft. The former turned northwest while the later continued west-northwest over central Mexico. Bret ultimately dissipated as a tropical cyclone by 06:00 UTC on June 30.

Effects 
Upon the operational classification of Tropical Depression Two at 22:00 UTC on June 28, the Government of Mexico issued a tropical storm warning for areas between the city of Veracruz and Tampico. This was rescinded less than 24-hours later as the storm moved inland and dissipated. In Tampico, alerts were issued over the threat of heavy rain.

Approximately 3,000 people required rescue in Naranjos. Dozens of homes were inundated as rivers topped their banks. Bret killed two people in Mexico – one in Naranjos and the other in Cerro Azul.

The damage total from Bret was estimated at 100 million pesos (US$9.3 million). Shortly after the passage of the storm, the government of Veracruz opened 6,000 emergency storm shelters for impacted citizens. Floodwaters from the rainfall inundated scores of houses and cars, forcing 2,800 people to evacuate, and affecting 7,500 families in Veracruz. The Mexican Army, combined with the efforts of police officers and state officials, worked with amphibious vehicles to rescue families in flooded houses, of whom many waited on rooftops. Landslides from the flooding cut communications and left 66 villages temporarily isolated. Across Veracruz, the most affected localities were Naranjos, Chinampa de Gorostiza, Tamalín, Tantima, Benito Juárez, Tamiahua, and Tempoal de Sánchez. The government of Veracruz declared a state of emergency for 14 municipalities. Damage in the state totaled over 100 million pesos (2005 MXN, US$9.3 million); the state government requested 100 million pesos (US$9.3 million) in reconstruction aid. One million pesos (US$93,000) was provided to Santiago Tuxtla to repair road infrastructure.

See also 

 Tropical Storm Gert (2005)
 Tropical Storm Jose (2005)

References

External links 
 NHC's archive on Tropical Storm Bret
 

2005 Atlantic hurricane season
Atlantic tropical storms
Atlantic hurricanes in Mexico
Tropical Storm Bret
Tropical cyclones in 2005